TCDD DH6000 was a single diesel-hydraulic shunter built for the Turkish State Railways by Jenbacher based on Jenbacher DH600C.

External links
 Trains of Turkey page on DH6000

DH06000
B locomotives
Individual locomotives of Turkey
Standard gauge locomotives of Turkey
Railway locomotives introduced in 1959